The Australian Biblical Review is an annual peer-reviewed academic journal in the field of biblical studies. It was established in 1951.

The journal is published each October by the Fellowship for Biblical Studies and aims to provide a forum for biblical scholarly research across the international community.

An online repository of articles from older issues is to be made available by BiblicalStudies.org.uk.

Abstracting and indexing
The journal is abstracted and indexed in the ATLA Religion Database.

References

External links

Biblical studies journals
Publications established in 1951
Annual journals
English-language journals